Aldanci is a village in the municipality of Kruševo, North Macedonia.

Demographics
According to the 2021 census, the village had a total of 442 inhabitants. Ethnic groups in the village include:

Albanians 429
Macedonians 5
Others 8

References

External links

Villages in Kruševo Municipality
Albanian communities in North Macedonia